Avihai Yadin (born 26 October 1986) is a former Israeli football defensive midfielder.

Career
He started to play football as a child when he was part of Hapoel Kfar Saba and became a member of the senior side when he was 19 years old. In 3 years with the senior team he made 86 caps, 2 goals and 1 assist and then moved to Hapoel Tel Aviv. He won a championship and 3 Cups with the club and played  more than 100 games. On 20 September 2012 he signed for 5 years at Maccabi Haifa.

Club career statistics
(correct as of December 2013)

Honours
Israel State Cup (3):
2010, 2011, 2012
Israeli Premier League (1):
2009–10

Footnotes

External links

1986 births
Living people
Israeli Jews
Israeli footballers
Israel international footballers
Hapoel Kfar Saba F.C. players
Hapoel Tel Aviv F.C. players
Maccabi Haifa F.C. players
Hapoel Ra'anana A.F.C. players
Footballers from Hod HaSharon
Israeli Premier League players
Liga Leumit players
Association football midfielders